Electromagnetic Source Imaging is a functional imaging technique, which uses Electroencephalography and/or Magnetoencephalography measurements to map functional areas of the Cerebral cortex.

See also
Magnetoencephalography

References

Electrodiagnosis